Cirsonella microscopia is a species of extremely small sea snail, a marine gastropod mollusk or micromollusk in the family Skeneidae.

Description
(Original description by Gatliff & Gabriel:) The diameter of this very minute shell is 0.75 mm. The white, semitranslucent, deeply umbilicated shell consists of four rounded whorls that rapidly increase in size.  The apex is smooth, and is succeeded by lirate whorls. The lirae number about five on the penultimate whorl, which increase in number by intercalation to about fifteen at the outer edge of the lip. The aperture is circular. The outer lip is simple.

Distribution
This marine species is endemic to Australia. It occurs off Victoria and the Bass Strait.

References

 Gabriel, C. & Gatliff, J.H. 1910. On some new species of Victorian marine Mollusca. Proceedings of the Royal Society of Victoria ns 23(1): 82-86, pls 18, 19 
 Cotton, B.C. 1959. South Australian Mollusca. Archaeogastropoda. Handbook of the Flora and Fauna of South Australia. Adelaide : South Australian Government Printer 449 pp

External links
 Australian Faunal Directory

microscopia
Gastropods described in 1910